Eugene John Moriarty (January 6, 1863 – May 18, 1904) was an American Major League Baseball outfielder. He played in the major leagues in 1884, 1885, and 1892. He also played in the minors from 1884 to 1892.

External links

1863 births
1904 deaths
19th-century baseball players
Major League Baseball outfielders
Boston Beaneaters players
Indianapolis Hoosiers (AA) players
Detroit Wolverines players
St. Louis Browns (NL) players
Boston Reserves players
Newark Domestics players
Indianapolis Hoosiers (minor league) players
Binghamton Crickets (1880s) players
LaCrosse Freezers players
Chicago Maroons players
Davenport Hawkeyes players
Davenport Monmouth players
Joliet Giants players
Meriden (minor league baseball) players
Baseball players from Massachusetts
Sportspeople from Holyoke, Massachusetts